Frederick Patterson (1 January 1916 – 29 May 1990) was an Australian rules footballer who played with  in the West Australian Football League (WAFL) and South Melbourne in the Victorian Football League (VFL).

Patterson played for East Perth from 1935 to 1940 before enlisting in the Royal Australian Air Force during World War II. While serving he played a single game for South Melbourne in Round 1 of the 1943 VFL season. He later served in the Pacific, being part of the Morotai Boomerangs services football team in 1945.

Notes

External links 

1916 births
1990 deaths
Australian rules footballers from Victoria (Australia)
Sydney Swans players
Royal Australian Air Force personnel of World War II
Royal Australian Air Force airmen
People from Day Dawn